EC130 may refer to:

 Eurocopter EC130
 Lockheed EC-130